Kendra Scott (born March 27, 1974) is an American fashion designer. She is the executive chairwoman, designer, and former chief executive officer of Kendra Scott, LLC. In 2017, she was named Ernst & Young's National Entrepreneur of the Year.

Early life and career
Kendra Scott was born in Kenosha, Wisconsin. At age 16, her family moved to Houston, Texas, where she graduated from Klein High School. Scott fell in love and "followed a boy" to Texas A&M University, which she attended for one year before dropping out to move to Austin, Texas, at age 19 to help with her ill stepfather.

Scott opened her first business, the Hat Box, which specializes in comfortable hats designed for women going through chemotherapy. Scott sold "comfortable but stylish" pieces and donated a portion of the proceeds to cancer research.

Before starting her own business, Scott started making jewelry from home in Austin, Texas.

Kendra Scott, LLC
Scott founded Kendra Scott LLC in 2002, designing her first collection with $500 in the spare bedroom of her home just after her oldest son was born. She walked store to store around Austin, selling to local boutiques, and at the last boutique she had to sell all of her samples to purchase enough materials to cover the orders she had made that first day.

In 2005, Scott's designs were chosen to accessorize Oscar de la Renta's spring 2006 runway show. Scott's designs also appeared in Randolph Duke's 2007 runway show.

Because of the financial crisis of 2007–2008, she nearly had to close her company, but she received an order from Nordstrom for some of their stores; this gave her exposure and allowed her to expand her business.

Scott's first retail store opened on Austin's South Congress Avenue in 2010. In the same year, she began her e-commerce business and launched the brand's Color Bar experience.

In 2011 she opened her second store on Rodeo Drive in Beverly Hills, but she had to close it after a while. In 2014 Scott opened stores around the South and Midwest while ignoring the fashion elite in New York and Los Angeles. Later, in 2016, she sold a minority stake in her company to the private equity firm Berkshire Partners at a valuation of $1 billion.

Valued at over $1 billion, her brand encompasses fashion jewelry, fine jewelry, home accessories, nail lacquer and beauty products.

At the end of 2019, Scott had 102 retail stores. In addition to an e-commerce business, Scott's merchandise is also sold in London's Selfridges, Nordstrom, Neiman Marcus, Von Maur, Bloomingdale's and over 1,000 specialty boutiques worldwide. 95 percent of her more than 2,000 staff are women. In February 2021, Scott stepped down as CEO, retaining the Executive Chairwoman title, and named Tom Nolan as Kendra Scott's CEO.

Scott invests in companies in Austin, Texas, such as Helm Boots, Darbie Angell dinnerware and Tiff's Treats.

Philanthropy
Scott is a philanthropist with a history of supporting women's and children's causes. In 2015, Scott launched the Kendra Cares Program, which brings the company's customizable Color Bar jewelry experience to pediatric hospitals across the country. In 2017, Scott's company hosted more than 10,000 Kendra Gives Back across her stores. She gave the money to local causes and also donated more than 75,000 pieces of jewelry.

In 2019, Scott donated $1 million to The University of Texas to launch the Kendra Scott Women's Entrepreneurial Leadership Institute. Since 2010 her company's program has given away $30 million.

Recognition
Scott was awarded the EY Entrepreneur of the Year 2017 National Award and the Breakthrough Award from the Accessories Council Excellence Awards. She is listed as #40 in Forbes' list of America's Richest Self-Made Women 2019, been named Outstanding Mother of the Year by the Mother's Day Council, Texas Businesswoman of the Year by the Women's Chamber of Commerce, Top 100 Entrepreneurs of the Year by Upstart Business Journal and 2017 CEO of the Year by the Austin Business Journal.

She is a member of the Council of Fashion Designers of America.

In 2019 she became the 12th woman in the state who has been inducted into the Texas Business Hall of Fame.

In April 2020, Governor Greg Abbott named Scott to the Strike Force to Open Texas – a group "tasked with finding safe and effective ways to slowly reopen the state" amid the COVID-19 pandemic.

Personal life
Kendra Scott, née Baumgartner, married John Scott on June 24, 2000. They had two children before divorcing on August 22, 2006. Scott remarried on June 6, 2014, to Matt Davis in Sedona, Arizona. They have one child together. They divorced in September 2020.

References

External links
Official website

American jewelry designers
Companies based in Austin, Texas
American retail chief executives
People from Kenosha, Wisconsin
American women chief executives
Artists from Austin, Texas
Artists from Wisconsin
1974 births
Living people
Klein High School alumni
21st-century American businesswomen
21st-century American businesspeople
Women jewellers
21st-century American philanthropists
21st-century women philanthropists
Businesspeople from Wisconsin
Businesspeople from Austin, Texas